Zhang Bao may refer to:

Zhang Bao (張寶), a Yellow Turban rebel leader, Zhang Jue's brother
Zhang Bao (張苞), Investigator of Shanyang Commandery
Zhang Bao (張苞), General of the Household of Li Jue
Zhang Bao (Shu Han) (張苞), son of Shu Han general Zhang Fei
Zhang Baozai, a naval colonel of Qing imperial navy, and former pirate